The 2006 season was the 12th season of New York Red Bulls's franchise existence, and their first year playing as the Red Bulls. They played their home games at Giants Stadium in East Rutherford, New Jersey.

Major League Soccer season

Eastern Conference

Overall

Matches

MLS Cup Playoffs

Conference semifinals

U.S. Open Cup

Player statistics

Top scorers

As of 31 December 2006.

See also
2006 Major League Soccer season

References

New
New York Red Bulls seasons
Red bulls